Anandiben Mafatbhai Patel  (born 21 November 1941) is an Indian politician serving as the 20th and current Governor of Uttar Pradesh. She also served as 17th Governor of Madhya Pradesh and Governor of Chhattisgarh. She has served as the first female Chief Minister of Gujarat. She is a member of the Bharatiya Janata Party (BJP) since 1987. She was the Cabinet Minister for Education from 2002 to 2007.

She was the cabinet Minister of Road and Building, Revenue, Urban development and Urban Housing, Disaster Management and Capital Projects in the Government of Gujarat from 2007 to 2014.

On 19 January 2018, she became the Governor of Madhya Pradesh replacing Om Prakash Kohli who was holding additional charge since September 2016.

Early life

Birth 
Anandiben Patel was born on 21 November 1941, in present-day Kharod village of Vijapur taluka of Mehsana district, Gujarat, where her father, Jethabhai, was a teacher.

Education

School 
She moved to N.M. High School for her high school studies which had only three girl students. As a student she was an athlete and remained a district level champion for three consecutive years. She joined college for studying BSc in 1960. She has excelled throughout as a student in her studies. She was awarded "Veer Bala" award in Mehsana for her outstanding achievement in athletics.

College 
Patel joined M. G. Panchal Science College at Pilvai in 1960. She completed a bachelor's degree in science in Visnagar. She married Mafatlal in 1962.

Teacher 
Anandiben Patel was not keen on becoming a teacher. She took the job of a teacher to support the family financially, responding to an advertisement in the newspaper. In her interview as a teacher, she chose to teach the most difficult problem of Mathematics. Patel worked as the teacher at Mohiniba Kanya Vidyalaya, Ahmedabad in 1967 or 1970, where she taught science and mathematics to higher secondary students. Later, she became the school's principal.

Political career

Bravery 

Patel's entry into politics began with an accident during a school picnic in 1987, when she jumped in the Sardar Sarovar reservoir to save two girls who were drowning during a school picnic, for which she received a president's bravery award. Impressed by Patel's heroism, BJP top cadre suggested Anandiben Patel to join the party. At first, she was hesitant in joining the party, but on persuasion by Keshubhai Patel and Narendra Modi, she joined BJP as the Gujarat Pradesh Mahila Morcha President in 1987.

Bird flu and service 
Patel's first notable work was during a spread of bird flu in the Viramgam district, where she spent weeks helping local citizens and appealing to government officials to take strong action. In 1992, she participated in Ekta Yatra from Kanyakumari to Srinagar with BJP leader Murli Manohar Joshi.

As a member of Parliament
Patel was elected to Rajya Sabha from Gujarat in 1994. As an MP, she participated in the Fourth World Women's Conference at Beijing (China) in 1994–95, representing India. She also visited Bulgaria with the BJP Leader, Atal Bihari Vajpayee, and speaker of the Lok Sabha, P. A. Sangma.

1998 – First election in MANDAL (As an Education Minister)
Patel resigned from Rajyasabha in 1998 and contested her first assembly election from MANDAL assembly constituency. She won and became the cabinet minister for education under the Chief Minister Keshubhai Patel.

In her first term as Education Minister, Patel started "Lokdarbar" to address issues related to schools and education.  It was under her leadership that the state Government first launched "Shala Praveshotsav" to increase enrollment in schools, which is still the flagship program of the Education department. Her efforts resulted in a 100% increase in enrollment.

In her first two years as an Education Minister, Patel initiated a campaign to recruit 26,000 teachers to fill positions that had been vacant for six years. She is also credited for her work to reduce corruption in the transfer of teachers. She established a school for handicapped children.

Second and third election from Patan (2002–2012)
Patel contested her second and third assembly elections in 2002 and 2007 from Patan assembly constituency and was elected.  She continued as a cabinet minister for education in her second term and was assigned to Roads & Building and Revenue in her third term.

A few of the high impact projects that took place during her time are: connecting Patan with the Narmada canal for the welfare of farmers; creating 174 check dams in the region; building one of the largest water filtration plants to provide citizens of Patan with pure drinking water; the construction of a new medical and engineering college in the region; and the creation of more than 700 km worth of road networks and underground drainage systems.

2012 – fourth term from Ghatlodiya
Patel contested and won from Ghatlodiya constituency in the 2012 elections. She won the election with a margin of more than 175,000 votes, the highest in the election. She continued as the cabinet minister of Road and Building, Revenue, Urban Development, and Urban Housing, Disaster Management and Capital Projects.

2014 – 2016 Chief Minister of Gujarat
On 22 May 2014, Patel took oath as the 15th Chief Minister of Gujarat succeeding Narendra Modi, after the latter was elected as Prime Minister of India following the victory of BJP in the 2014 Indian general election. Patel was the first female Chief Minister of Gujarat. She expressed her desire to resign on 1 August 2016 as she was turning 75 years old in November 2016. She submitted her resignation to the Governor O. P. Kohli on 4 August 2016 which was accepted. She continued to hold the office until her successor Vijay Rupani took over on 7 August 2016.

Governorships (2018–)

In January 2018, she became the Governor of Madhya Pradesh replacing Om Prakash Kohli, who was an additional charge governor. Later in August 2018, she took additional charge as the Governor of Chhattisgarh due to sudden demise of then governor Balram Das Tandon. On 20 July 2019, she became Governor of Uttar Pradesh on end of term of Ram Naik.

Personal life

On 29 May 1962, Anandiben and Mafatlal Patel married; Mafatlal was 28 years old. After living in Mehsana district for four years, the couple moved to Ahmedabad. Mafatlal was a professor of psychology at the Saraspur Art and Commerce College, and Anandiben taught mathematics and science, and later became principal, at Mohiniba Kanya Vidyalaya on Ashram Road, Ahmedabad. They did not legally separate, but they began living apart in 1985. Patel voluntarily retired from teaching after 31 years. The couple have two children, Sanjay and Anar. Sanjay is married to Hina and they have one son, Dharm. Anar is married to Jayesh, and they have one daughter Sanskruti.

Recognition
The Indian Express has listed her in top 100 most influential people of India for the year 2014.
Felicitated with Governor's Award for best teacher in Gujarat (1988)
Felicitated with the President's Award for the best teacher (1989)
Felicitated with 'Sardar Patel' Award by Patel Jagruti Mandal, Mumbai (1999)
Felicitated with the 'Vidya Gaurav' Award by Shri Tapodhan Brahman Vikas Mandal (2000)
Felicitated with 'Patidar Shiromani' Award by the Patel community (2005)
Special honour bestowed by Dharati Vikas Mandal for Women's Upliftment Campaign.
'Veerbala' award for ranking first in Mahesana District school sports event.

Gallantry awards
Gallantry Award for rescuing two girls of Mohinaba Girls' school from drowning at Navagam reservoir in Narmada.
Winner of Charumati Yoddha Award (Jyotisangh), Ahmedabad.
Winner of Ambubhai Purani Vyayam Vidyalay Award (Rajpipala).

See also

 Anandiben Patel ministry

References

External links

 Gujarat Government
 Maximum People Performed Yoga (Multiple Venues)
Anandiben Patel's daughter Anar Patel

|-

|-

|-

|-

|-

Gujarat MLAs 2012–2017
Chief Ministers of Gujarat
Chief ministers from Bharatiya Janata Party
Women chief ministers of Indian states
State cabinet ministers of Gujarat
Women in Gujarat politics
Living people
1941 births
Rajya Sabha members from Gujarat
Indian schoolteachers
People from Patan district
Indian women educational theorists
Gujarat MLAs 2007–2012
Gujarat MLAs 2002–2007
Gujarat MLAs 1998–2002
20th-century Indian educational theorists
20th-century Indian women scientists
20th-century Indian women politicians
20th-century Indian politicians
21st-century Indian women politicians
21st-century Indian politicians
Educators from Gujarat
Women state cabinet ministers of India
Bharatiya Janata Party politicians from Gujarat
Governors of Madhya Pradesh
Women educators from Gujarat
Governors of Uttar Pradesh
20th-century women educators
Women state governors of India
Women members of the Rajya Sabha